Penieli Latu (born 20 February 1973) is a former Tongan rugby union player. He represented  at the 1995 Rugby World Cup. He debuted against  on June 4, 1994. His last match was against  a year later on July 15.

He played for South Canterbury's Celtic Rugby Club alongside his three younger brothers.

References

External links
 Penieli P. J. Latu at New Zealand Rugby History

1973 births
Living people
Tongan expatriates in Japan
Tongan expatriates in New Zealand
Tongan rugby union players
Tonga international rugby union players
South Canterbury rugby union players
Rugby union centres